In enzymology, a glycolipid 3-alpha-mannosyltransferase is an enzyme that catalyzes the chemical reaction in which an alpha-D-mannosyl residue is transferred from GDP-mannose to a lipid-linked oligosaccharide, being attached by an alpha-1,3-D-mannosyl-D-mannose bond.

This enzyme belongs to the family of glycosyltransferases, specifically the hexosyltransferases.  The systematic name of this enzyme class is GDP-mannose:glycolipid 1,3-alpha-D-mannosyltransferase. Other names in common use include mannosyltransferase II, guanosine diphosphomannose-oligosaccharide-lipid II, mannosyltransferase, and GDP-mannose-oligosaccharide-lipid mannosyltransferase II.  This enzyme participates in the biosynthesis of n-glycan and glycan structures.

References

 

EC 2.4.1
Enzymes of unknown structure